Adil Khan may refer to:
  Adil Khan (actor) (born 1983), Norwegian actor
 Adil Khan (footballer) (born 1988), Indian footballer
 Muhammad Adil Khan (19572020), Pakistani Islamic scholar

See also
 Adilkhan Sagindykov (born 1979), Kazakh taekwondo practitioner
 Adilkhan Garahmadov (born 2001), Azerbaijani footballer